James Douglas Ogilby (16 February 1853 – 11 August 1925) was an Australian ichthyologist and herpetologist.

Ogilby was born in Belfast, Ireland, and was the son of zoologist William Ogilby and his wife Adelaide, née Douglas.  He received his education at Winchester College, England, and Trinity College, Dublin.

Ogilby worked for the British Museum before joining the Australian Museum in Sydney.  After being let go for drunkenness in 1890, he picked up contract work before joining the Queensland Museum in Brisbane circa 1903.

He was the author of numerous scientific papers on reptiles, and he described a new species of turtle and several new species of lizards.

Ogilby died on 11 August 1925 and was buried at Toowong Cemetery.

See also
:Category:Taxa named by James Douglas Ogilby

References

External links

Grave location

1853 births
1925 deaths
Australian marine biologists
Australian taxonomists
Australian ichthyologists
Employees of the British Museum
Scientists from Belfast
Australian people of Irish descent
Burials at Toowong Cemetery
20th-century Australian zoologists
19th-century Australian zoologists